Alexandru Budişteanu (October 10, 1907—1951) was a Romanian bobsledder who competed in the mid-1930s. At the 1936 Winter Olympics in Garmisch-Partenkirchen, finishing 16th in the two-man event and did not finish in the four-man event.

References
1936 bobsleigh two-man results
1936 bobsleigh four-man results
Alexandru Budişteanu's profile at Sports Reference.com

1907 births
1951 deaths
Romanian male bobsledders
Bobsledders at the 1936 Winter Olympics
Olympic bobsledders of Romania